Randall Jahnson is an American writer, director and producer. His works include Dudes, The Doors, The Mask of Zorro, Sunset Strip, and episodes of the HBO TV series Tales from the Crypt. Also, Jahson co-wrote Dryads - Girls Don't Cry with Stan Hellevig, which was released in Norway in 2015. Jahnson also directed music videos for Stan Ridgway, Henry Rollins, Black Flag, and Minutemen. In the 1987, he launched the independent record label Blue Yonder Sounds in Los Angeles. The label released four albums: Civilization and Its Discotheques by The Fibonaccis, Bigger than Breakfast by Slack, Three Gals, Three Guitars by The Del Rubio Triplets, and Motel Cafe by Michael C. Ford.

He also wrote Gun, a Western video game which was voted Best Story at the 2005 IGN Video Game Awards.

Filmography

Film
 Dudes (1987)
 The Doors (1991)
 The Mask of Zorro (1998)
 Sunset Strip (2000)
 Dryads - Girls Don't Cry (2015)

Television
 Tales from the Crypt (1990–1992)

Music videos
 "This Ain't No Picnic", Minutemen (1984)
 "Ain't Talkin' 'bout Love", Minutemen (1984)
 "King of the Hill", Minutemen (1985)
 "Melrose Rap", Henry Rollins (1985)
 "No Deposit, No Return", Henry Rollins (1985)
 "Drinking and Driving", Black Flag (1986)
 "Big Dumb Town", Stan Ridgway (1996)
 "Knife and Fork", Stan Ridgway (1996)

Video Games
 Gun (2005)

References

External links
 
 randalljahnson.com

1959 births
American film directors
American film producers
American music video directors
20th-century American dramatists and playwrights
American male screenwriters
Living people
American male dramatists and playwrights
20th-century American male writers